A Sahajdhari Sikh (Punjabi: ਸਹਜਧਾਰੀ ; Meaning "spiritual state of equilibrium adopter") is a person who believes in Sikhism but is not an Amritdhari. A Sahajdhari adheres to the principles of Sikhism and the teachings of the Sikh gurus but may not wear all of the Five Symbols of Sikhism. For example, Sahajdhari Sikhs often wear a kara, but many of them cut their hair (kesh).

Despite it being instructed by Guru Gobind Singh for Sikhs to become Amritdhari during the formation of the Khalsa, in modern times, particularly in the western world some Sikhs have chosen to cut their hair or beard. 

According to the Delhi Sikh Gurdwaras Act of 1971 and the Shiromani Gurdwara Parbandhak Committee, a Sahajdhari Sikh can be regarded as a Sikh. However, they cannot claim to be an Amritdhari Sikhs and must raise their children within the Sikh faith.

Etymology
Sahajdhari is a compound word consisting of the two words sahaj and dhari. In Sanskrit and other Indo-Aryan languages, the words Sahaj means "spiritual state of equilibrium" and dhari means "adopter".

Introduction
A sahajdhari believes in all the tenets of Sikhism and the teaching of the Sikh Gurus, but has not undergone Amrit Sanchar, and may not strictly adhere to all Sikh practices all the time, as Amritdhari Sikhs do.

According to the Shiromani Gurdwara Prabandhak Committee, the Sahajdhari Sikhs are those who believe in the Gurus of Sikhism.

History
According to sources, Bhai Nand Lal asked Guru Gobind Singh ji how many types of Sikhs there are, and Guru Gobind Singh ji replied, saying, ਤਿਨ ਪ੍ਰਕਾਰ ਮਮ ਸਿੱਖ ਹੈ।। ਸਹਜੇ ਚਰਨੀ ਖੰਡ।।. In the early eighteenth century when Sikhs defied the persecutors and courted martyrdom as did the teenage Haqiqat Singh Rai, who was beheaded in public for his refusal to disown his Sikh belief and accept Islam. Haqiqat rai was Sahajdhari Sikh. A leading Sahajdhari Sikh of that time was Kaura Mall, a minister to the Mughal governor of Lahore, Mu'in ul-Mulk (1748–53), who helped the Sikhs in different ways in those days of severe trial. He had so endeared himself to them that they called him Mittha (sweet, in Punjabi) Mall instead of Kaura (which, in Punjabi, means "bitter") Mall. Sikh tradition also recalls another Sahajdhari Sikh of this period, Des Raj, who was entrusted by the Khalsa with the task of reconstructing the Harimandar, which was demolished by the Afghan invader Ahmad Shah Durrani in 1762. Sikh tradition also recalls another Sahajdhari sikh, Dina Nath, who was the Sikh Empire minister. Sikh tradition also recalls another Sahajdhari Sikh, Bhai Vasti Ram, a learned man well-versed in Sikh scriptures, who enjoyed considerable influence at the court.
 
Sahajdhari Sikhs have continued participating in Sikh life right up to modern times, and have associated themselves with Sikh institutions and organizations such as the Shiromani Gurdwara Parbandhak Committee, Chief Khalsa Diwan, Shiromani Akali Dal, and the All-India Sikh Students Federation. The Singh Sabhas used to have seats on their executive committees reserved for the Sahajdharis. Among their own societies, confined mainly to north-western India prior to the migrations of 1947, were the Sahajdhari Committee of Multan, Guru Nanak Sahajdhari Diwan of Panja Sahib and Sri Guru Nanak Sahajdhari Jatha of Campbellpore.  The Sahajdhari Diwan of Panja Sahib attained the status of their central forum. They had as well their annual conference, which met for its first session on 13 April 1929 under the chairmanship of Sir Jogendra Singh, who passed on the office to the famous Sikh scholar and savant, Bhai Kahn Singh. A Sahajdharis' conference formed part of the annual proceedings of the Sikh Educational Conference.
 
The Sahajdharis share all of the religious, and social customs and ceremonies with the main body of the Sikhs, and join their congregations in the gurdwaras. The population in the Punjab of Sahajdhari Sikhs (another name used is Sikh Nanakpanthis) according to the 1891 Census was 397,000 (20% of the total Sikh population); according to the 1901 Census, 297,000 (13% of the total Sikhs); according to the 1911 Census, 451,000 (14.9% of the total Sikhs); according to the 1921 Census, 229,000 (7% of the total Sikhs); according to the 1931 Census, 282,000 (6.5% of the total Sikhs).  Outside of Punjab, the North-West Frontier Province and Sindh had considerable Sahajdhari populations.  Consequent to the partition of India in 1947, Sahajdharis became widely dispersed in the country.  Their India-wide forum was the Sarab Hind (All-India) Sahajdharis Conference, which rotated from town to town for its annual sessions.  Three of its presidents, Gur Darshan Singh, Sant Ram Singh and Ram Lal Singh Rahi, the founding Executive Vice President of Sarab Hind (All-India) Sahajdharis Conference, were recognized with the  "Nishan-e-Khalsa" award by the Anandpur Foundation at the Tercentennial Celebration of Khalsa in 1999.

Five Ks

The Five Ks, or panj kakaar/kakke, are the five items of faith that all initiated Sikhs (Amritdhari) are required to wear at all times (but does not apply to Sahajdhari Sikhs), at the command of the tenth Sikh Guru, Guru Gobind Singh, who so ordered at the Baisakhi Amrit Sanskar in 1699. They are:
 Kesh (uncut hair)
 Kanga (wooden comb)
 Kacchera (specially-designed underwear)
 Kara (iron bracelet)
 Kirpan (strapped sword)
They are for the identification and representation of the ideals of Sikhism, such as honesty, equality, fidelity, meditating on God, and never bowing to tyranny.

Nanakpanthi
Most Nanakpanthi (Sikh Sect) also are of Sehajdhari backgrounds.

Contemporary Notable Sahajdharis
 Bhai Ram Lal Singh Rahi - Now an Amritdhari Sikh, was the founding Executive Vice President of Sarab Hind (All-India) Sahajdharis Conference, recognized with the "Nishan-e-Khalsa" award by the Anadpur Foundation at the Tercentennial Celebration of Khalsa in 1999.
 Deep Sidhu - Sikh youth leader
 Udham Singh - Indian Independence Freedom Fighter
 Hardeep Grewal - Canadian MPP
 Harry Bains - Canadian Politician
 Sukh Dhaliwal - Canadian MP

See also
Khalsa
Prohibitions in Sikhism
Gurmat
Gurmukh
Manmukh
Patit

References

Further reading
 Kirpal Singh and Harbans Lal of Global Sikh Studies
  Concepts In Sikhism, Edited by Dr. Surinder Singh Sodhi
 SIKH IDENTITY: Continuity and Change, Eds. Pashaura Singh and N. Gerald Barrier, Manohar Publications, New Delhi

Sikh terminology